Wuyuan County is a county in northeastern Jiangxi province, People's Republic of China, bordering the provinces of Zhejiang to the east and Anhui to the north. It is under the jurisdiction of the prefecture-level city of Shangrao.

Wuyuan, on the boundary of three provinces in Jiangxi's northeastern corner, has a landscape dotted with strange caves, deep secluded rocks and numerous historic sites. Wuyuan County is home to some of the best-preserved ancient architecture in China. Wuyuan's structures were built in 740 during the Tang Dynasty, its remoteness and inconvenient transportation protecting its villages from too many visitors.

It was a county in Huizhou, Anhui province until 1989.

Administrative divisions
In the present, Wuyuan County has 1 subdistrict, 10 towns and 6 townships.
1 subdistrict
 Rancheng

10 towns

6 townships

Demographics 

Culture
The dialect of Wuyuan county is of the Hui dialects, and its culture closely resembles that of Huizhou in southern Anhui.

Economy

The GDP of Wuyuan in 2011 is 5.622 billion yuan (RMB).

Transportation
 Railway: Hefei–Fuzhou High-Speed Railway
 Highway: G56 Hangzhou–Ruili Expressway, S22 Dexing–Wuyuan Expressway

Climate

Scenic Sites
 Wuyuan Huangling Tourism Resort

Notes and references

External links

  Government site - 
Wyly.org

 
Shangrao
County-level divisions of Jiangxi
County-level divisions of Anhui